Coleophora congeriella is a moth of the family Coleophoridae. It is found from the Czech Republic and Slovakia to the Iberian Peninsula, Italy and Greece and from France to Bulgaria.

The larvae feed on Dorycnium hirsutum, Dorycnium pentaphyllum and Dorycnium pentaphyllum germanicum. They create a composite leaf case made out of three to five relatively large mined leaf fragments. The rear end is narrowed and bent downwards. The mouth angle is 30-45° and the mouth opening is somewhat shifted to the side. Larvae can be found from August to April.

References

congeriella
Moths described in 1859
Moths of Europe